The Podujevo bus bombing was an attack on a bus carrying Serb civilians near the town of Podujevo in Kosovo on 16 February 2001. The bombing killed twelve Serb civilians who were travelling to Gračanica and injured dozens more. Albanian extremists are suspected of being responsible for the attack. Gračanica is a predominantly Serb-populated town in central Kosovo, near the regional capital Pristina, in a predominantly Albanian-populated area. Following the Kosovo War in 1999 it became an enclave within Albanian-controlled territory. Relations between the two communities were tense and occasionally violent.

Background
In early 1998, Serbian police forces moved to put down an uprising by ethnic Albanians in central Kosovo. The North Atlantic Treaty Organization (NATO) responded by launching a bombing campaign against the Federal Republic of Yugoslavia on 24 March 1999. The campaign lasted for 78 days and ended when the Yugoslav Army (VJ) left the province on 12 June. The 40,000 withdrawing Yugoslav soldiers were replaced by an estimated 50,000 NATO troops. The 848,000 Albanians who were displaced from their homes during the war quickly returned as about 230,000 Serbs, Roma and other non-Albanians were forcibly cleansed from Kosovo or fled it in fear of retaliatory attacks. At least an estimated 300 Serbs were killed by Kosovo Albanians in attacks following the war. Approximately 100 Serbian Orthodox churches and monasteries were damaged or destroyed in the region by the end of 1999. Kosovo Liberation Army (KLA) officials condemned some of the attacks while Albanian media organizations attempted to justify them, calling the churches "symbols of Serbian fascism". Serbian authorities urged international forces to prevent further attacks from occurring.

There was widespread unrest in Kosovo in 2000. On 6 June 2000, a grenade was thrown at a crowd of ethnic Serbs waiting for a bus in the town square of Gračanica, injuring three people, which was followed by some civil unrest.

Since 22 January 2001 an insurgency was carried out in Macedonia by the ethnic Albanian NLA, established by former KLA fighters.

Attack
The so-called Niš Express was a convoy of five or seven buses which carried 200 ethnic Serbs from Kosovo to the southeastern Serbian city of Niš and back. The convoy was under the protection of a British unit of KFOR and was escorted by five Swedish armoured vehicles. A remote-controlled bomb exploded in its vicinity at noon on 16 February 2001 as it passed through the Albanian-populated town of Podujevo while returning from Niš to the Serbian enclave in Gračanica. The Serbs were travelling to visit family graves in Gračanica on the Orthodox Christian Day of the Dead. The first bus took the full force of the blast. It contained 57 passengers and most of those killed or wounded in the attack were sitting in it. KFOR had received advance warning of the attack and conducted a search of the bus route but failed to uncover any explosive devices. The youngest victim was Danilo Cokic (1999-2001)   Reports suggested that the patrol conducting the search was distracted just prior to the explosion by two men acting suspiciously.

The explosion caused many injuries and United Nations helicopters were used to airlift at least three victims to hospital. The buses not affected by the blast were able to drive away from the scene. The two men who were spotted by the KFOR patrol before the attack were taken into custody.

Aftermath
Kosovo Albanian extremists were suspected of orchestrating the attack. Initial reports suggested that 7 people were killed by the blast. Two wounded Serbs died en route to the hospital and the body parts of two others were found amongst the debris of the bus. 12 people were killed and 40 were injured by the blast. According to KFOR's regional commander, the bomb was made of 100–200 pounds of high explosive. The explosion created a crater that was six feet deep and twelve feet wide.

Serbs living in Kosovo enclaves began forming crowds and attacking Albanians within one hour of the attack. Serbs in the enclave of Čaglavica blocked the road leading to Macedonia and pulled ethnic Albanians out of their cars and assaulted them. The relatives of the victims reacted by staging violent protests in Gračanica.
 
NATO leaders condemned the blast and called it "premeditated murder". NATO peacekeepers on the ground described the bombing as an indiscriminate attack. NATO Secretary General George Robertson responded to the blast by saying "NATO did not conduct its air campaign in order to see ethnic cleansing by one group replaced by the ethnic attacks and intimidation of another". He warned that Kosovo was in danger of losing the support of the international community if violence continued. The Parliament of Yugoslavia protested the bombing—which it deemed an act of terrorism—by cutting short its session.

A bomb attack in April 2001 targeting Serbs in Pristina left one dead and four injured (KLA volunteer Roland Bartetzko was later found guilty).

Arrests
Controversy surrounds the arrests and subsequent release of the suspects. Five Albanian men were arrested for the attack. Four men were later suspected of committing the attack, but they escaped from a U.S. detention facility in 2002. One Albanian, Florim Ejupi, was convicted in 2008 of planting the bomb and sentenced to 40 years in prison. However, he was released on 13 March 2009. On 5 June 2009, EULEX's chief prosecutor announced that the EU mission had opened a new inquest into the case that had been given to the special prosecutor's office in charge of war crimes cases.

Notes

References

 
 
 
 
 
 

Mass murder in 2001
Persecution of Serbs
Bus bombings in Europe
2001 crimes in Kosovo
Podujevo
2000s murders in Kosovo
2001 murders in Europe
Terrorist incidents in Kosovo
Terrorist incidents in Europe in 2001
Improvised explosive device bombings in 2001